The Jeju Tourism Organization (JTO) is a public company associated with Jeju Special Self-Governing Province in the Republic of Korea (South Korea). It is tasked with promoting Jeju Island's tourism industry domestically and internationally.

The JTO was established in 2008 as a government-invested corporation promoting Jeju Island as a tourist destination for both domestic and international tourists. Its headquarters, called the Jeju Welcome Center, is located in the Yeon-dong neighborhood of Jeju City, near the Jeju provincial government complex.

Its mandate includes:

 Integrated public relations and marketing
 Tour product development (local and international)
 Research and support for the local tourism industry
 Hosting international tourism-related events and conferences (ITOP Forum, Asia Cruise Forum)
 Surveys, smart tourism, big data projects and other research areas
 For-profit duty-free business operations

The JTO operates a Jeju travel information website VisitJeju.net in multiple languages (Korean, English, Chinese, Japanese) as well as the Jeju Tourist Information Center.

Prior to the COVID-19 pandemic, inbound travelers to Jeju topped 15 million domestic and 1.5 million international visitors. The visa policy of Jeju Province, which varies from that of the South Korean mainland, applied to 180 nationalities and allowed for stays of up to 30 days when arriving directly from overseas. It has since been suspended due to national and provincial pandemic prevention measures.

History 
 1946: Jeju Airport begins operation.
 1959: Seogwipo Tourist Hotel opens.
 1963: Jeju-Mokpo ferry route begins operation.
 1973: Jeju Tourism Office established.
 1980: Visa-free entry (15 days) program for foreigners begins.
 1985: Jeju Information Center opens at Jeju International Airport.
 1992: Korea-China Friendship
 1996: Japanese Consulate opens.
 1998: World Island Cultural Festival opens.
 2002: Biosphere Reserve designation
 2004: UNEP, PATA, ADB Jeju Conference opens.
 2007: UNESCO World Natural Heritage designation
 2007: Jeju Olle walking trail system opens.
 2008: Jeju Tourism Organization established.
 2010: Global Geopark Network designation
 2012: Chinese Consulate opens in Jeju.
 2013: A record 10 million visitors arrive in one year.
 2015: A record 13 million visitors arrive in one year.
 2016: Jeju Special Self-Governing Province establishes a tourism department.

See also 

 Korea Tourism Organization
 Seoul Tourism Organization

References

External links 
 Visitjeju.net (in English)
 Visitjeju.net (in Korean)

 
Jeju Province